Manuel Pereiras García (born 1950) is the author and translator of numerous plays in English and Spanish.

Biography
Pereiras García was born in Cifuentes, Cuba, in 1950. His works have been performed at Mercy College, Dumé Spanish Theatre, Stonewall Repertory Theatre, Theater for the New City, and INTAR Theatre. Pereiras García has also written about the history of theater with a focus on Cuban and Spanish drama. In 1998, his complete plays were published by Presbyter's Peartree. He currently resides in New York City.

Works or publications

References

External links

 The Manuel Pereiras García playscripts are available at the Cuban Heritage Collection, University of Miami Libraries. This collection consists of playscripts authored or translated by Cuban-born playwright Manuel Pereiras García between 1977 and 1991.
 Creator page for Manuel Pereiras García in the Cuban Theater Digital Archive.

1950 births
Cuban dramatists and playwrights
Cuban male writers
American male dramatists and playwrights
American dramatists and playwrights
Hispanic and Latino American dramatists and playwrights
Living people
Cuban translators